Agnar Christensen (born 5 June 1969) is a Norwegian football manager and former player. He is the former manager of Tromsø IL in the Norwegian Premier League.

References

Living people
1969 births
Norwegian footballers
Norwegian football managers
Tromsø IL managers
Association footballers not categorized by position